DNA polymerase alpha catalytic subunit is an enzyme that in humans is encoded by the POLA1 gene.

Function 

This gene encodes the p180 catalytic subunit of DNA polymerase α-primase. Pol α has limited processivity and lacks 3′ exonuclease activity for proofreading errors. Thus it is not well suited to efficiently and accurately copy long templates (unlike Pol Delta and Epsilon). Instead it plays a more limited role in replication. Pol α is responsible for the initiation of DNA replication at origins of replication (on both the leading and lagging strands) and during synthesis of Okazaki fragments on the lagging strand. The Pol α complex (pol α-DNA primase complex) consists of four subunits: the catalytic subunit POLA1, the regulatory subunit POLA2, and the small and the large primase subunits PRIM1 and PRIM2 respectively. Once primase has created the RNA primer, Pol α starts replication elongating the primer with ~20 nucleotides.

Clinical significance 

In addition to its role during DNA replication, POLA1 plays a role in type I interferon activation.  The POLA1 gene was found to be the site of a mutation resulting in X-linked reticulate pigmentary disorder (XLPDR), OMIM 301220).  This leads to altered mRNA splicing and decreased expression of POLA1 protein to a level that does not impair DNA replication. The reduction in POLA1 expression is accompanied by marked reduction in cytosolic RNA:DNA hybrid molecules and a concomitant hyperactivation of the IRF3 pathway, with consequent overproduction of type I interferons.

Moreover, POLA1 deficiency, typical for XLPDR, also impair direct cytotoxicity of NK cells. POLA1 inhibition or a natural deficiency (XLPDR) affects the way the lytic granules secreted toward target cells. As a result, NK cells in XLPDR patients display functional deficiency. Interestingly, the POLA1 deficiency typical for XLPDR is not associated with any genomic damages or cell cycle arrest.

While the XLPDR mutation is resided in intron 13th, other somatic mutations in POLA1 were also described. Somatic mutation are associated with more profound deficiency of POLA1, with develops into X-linked intellectual disability (XLID). In a case of non-XLPDR mutations, beside of type I interferon signature patients also display mild to medium signs of intellectual disability, cell cycle arrest, proportionate short stature, microcephaly and hypogonadism.

Interactions 

DNA dependent polymerase alpha (Pol α) has been shown to interact with MCM4 and GINS1, Retinoblastoma protein, PARP1 and RBMS1.

See also 
 DNA Polymerase
 DNA polymerase alpha subunit 2

References

External links 
 PDBe-KB provides an overview of all the structure information available in the PDB for Human DNA polymerase alpha catalytic subunit

Further reading